Limbudin     is a village development committee in the Himalayas of Taplejung District in the Province No. 1 of north-eastern Nepal. At the time of the 2011 Nepal census it had a population of 1,832 people living in 356 individual households. There were 841 males and 991 females at the time of census.

References

External links
 UN map of the municipalities of Taplejung District

Populated places in Taplejung District